Mark Bell may refer to:

Athletes
 Mark Bell (defensive end) (born 1957), National Football League player (Seattle Seahawks)
 Mark Bell (wide receiver) (born 1957), National Football League player (St. Louis Cardinals)
 Mark Bell (cyclist) (1960–2009), British Olympic cyclist
 Mark Bell (footballer) (1881–1961), Scottish footballer
 Mark Bell (ice hockey) (born 1980), Canadian ice hockey player
 Mark Bell (rugby league) (born 1967), Australian rugby league footballer

Musicians
 Mark Bell (British musician) (1971–2014), British musician and producer
 Mark Bell (New Zealand musician) (fl. 2000s), New Zealand musician and songwriter

Other people
 Mark Bell (journalist) (born 1985), American journalist
 Mark Sever Bell (1843–1906), English recipient of the Victoria Cross

See also
 Marc Bell (disambiguation)